Francesco Costa (1672–1740) was an Italian painter of the late-Baroque period, active mainly in his Native Genoa. He was the pupil of the painter Gregorio de Ferrari in Genoa, and later of Antonio Maria Haffner. He often painted with Giovanni Battista Revello (il Mustacchi). He painted in the Palazzo Grilli in Pegli, Genoa. He chiefly painted ornaments and quadratura. He painted Landscape with Rape of Europa which currently sits in the Uffizi museum.

References

1672 births
1740 deaths
Painters from Genoa
17th-century Italian painters
Italian male painters
18th-century Italian painters
Italian Baroque painters
Quadratura painters
18th-century Italian male artists